Serhat Ardahan Spor Klübü (commonly known as Serhat Ardahanspor) is a Turkish soccer team, located in Ardahan Province and founded in 2013. The club is nicknamed Bulls (Turkish:Boğalar).

The club was promoted to Turkish Regional Amateur League in 2014 as champion of Ardahan Amateur Football League. The club played in the first round of the 2014–15 Turkish Cup and reached the second round of the 2016–17 Turkish Cup.

Football clubs in Turkey
Association football clubs established in 2013
2013 establishments in Turkey